Antonio S. Negrón García is a Puerto Rican jurist. He served as a municipal judge before being appointed to the Supreme Court of Puerto Rico. He served for 26 years, gaining a reputation as one of the court's most prolific justices.

Early life 

Negrón García was born 31 December 1940 in Río Piedras, Puerto Rico. His father was Luis Negrón Fernández, who would eventually serve as Associate Justice and Chief Justice of the Court. He earned a B.A. from the University of Puerto Rico in 1962, and earned his law degree from the same in 1964.

Law career 

Upon being admitted to the bar that same year, Negrón García went to work as a legal advisor for the Puerto Rico Power and Water company. He served as a judge in a District Court from 1966 to 1969, at which point he was elevated to a Superior Court. From 1972 to 1974 he presided over the Governor's Judicial Appointment Advisory Committee, as well as serving as Executive Secretary of the Justice Reform Council of Puerto Rico.

Supreme Court 

After Trías Monge's appointment to Chief Justice in 1974, there remained one vacancy in the Supreme Court. Governor Rafael Hernández Colón had avoided filling the spot until Negrón García had fulfilled the Supreme Courts requirement for membership: ten years as a licensed jurist in Puerto Rico. At the time, he was the youngest person ever to be appointed to the Supreme Court.

Retirement 

In 2000 Negrón García retired after 26 years as an Associate Justice of the Supreme Court. He is currently a professor at the Universidad Interamericana. He writes occasional columns for El Nuevo Día, and he serves as an advisor to the Joint Commission on the Revision of the Civil Code of Puerto Rico in the matter of torts.

Sources 

La Justicia en sus Manos by Luis Rafael Rivera, 

Associate Justices of the Supreme Court of Puerto Rico
Puerto Rican lawyers
Living people
People from Río Piedras, Puerto Rico
Puerto Rican judges
Year of birth missing (living people)